The 2022 Minor League Cricket season (branded as the 2022 Toyota Minor League Cricket championship presented by Sunoco for sponsorship reasons and sometimes shortened to 2022 MiLC) was the second season of Minor League Cricket, established by USA Cricket (USAC) and Major League Cricket (MLC) in 2019. Toyota returned from the previous season as title sponsor, with Sunoco tapped as the Official Fuel and Convenience Store of MiLC. The season was hosted over 20 venues across the United States, with matches being broadcast through Willow and Sling TV. It was played from June 25 to August 28, 2022.

The tournament was won by the Seattle Thunderbolts, who defeated the Atlanta Fire in the final played in Morrisville, North Carolina by 10 runs, with Phani Simhadri of the Seattle Thunderbolts winning the award for Most Valuable Player of the series. The Silicon Valley Strikers were the defending champions.

Venues 
The complete list of ground venues was announced by Major League Cricket a day prior to the season opening.

  – Western Division (Pacific Conference)
  – Central Division (Pacific Conference)
  – Eastern Division (Atlantic Conference)
  – Southern Division (Atlantic Conference)

Teams 

For this season, the Chicago Catchers and the Atlanta Param Veers franchises were replaced by the Chicago Tigers and the Atlanta Lightning, while the  Austin Athletics and the Irving Mustangs were renamed the Lone Star Athletics and the Dallas Mustangs respectively. It was also announced that the Florida Beamers were on hiatus for the 2022 season, and as such, would not return for this season.

In June 2022, it was also announced that the Morrisville Cardinals would also be discontinued, and the Morrisville Raptors would take over.

Squads 
Each team released their squad on May 16, 2022.

Results

Atlantic Conference

Pacific Conference

League stage 
The league stage ran from June 25 to August 14. The schedule and venues of the playoffs was announced on August 4 by Major League Cricket.

The season had a total prize pool of $350,000, with the winner taking home $150,000.

Atlantic Conference

Southern Division 

 Top two teams advance to the Quarterfinals
  advances to Quarterfinals to play 2nd-place Eastern Division team
  advances to Quarterfinals to play 1st-place Eastern Division team

Eastern Division 

 Top two teams advance to the Quarterfinals
  advances to Quarterfinals to play 2nd-place Southern Division team
  advances to Quarterfinals to play 1st-place Southern Division team

Pacific Conference

Central Division 

 Top two teams advance to the Quarterfinals
  advances to Quarterfinals to play 2nd-place Western Division team
  advances to Quarterfinals to play 1st-place Western Division team

Western Division 

 Top two teams advance to the Quarterfinals
  advances to Quarterfinals to play 2nd-place Central Division team
  advances to Quarterfinals to play 1st-place Central Division team

Playoffs

Quarter-finals

Semi-finals

Final

Statistics

Most runs

Most wickets

References 

Cricket in the United States
Youth cricket in the United States
American domestic cricket competitions
Twenty20 cricket matches
Minor League Cricket
Cricket leagues in the United States